Metaponto is a railway station in Metaponto, Italy. The station is located on the Taranto–Reggio di Calabria railway and Battipaglia–Metaponto railway. The train services are operated by Trenitalia.

Train services
The station is served by the following service(s):

Intercity services Rome - Naples - Salerno - Taranto
Intercity services Reggio di Calabria - Siderno - Crotone - Rossano - Taranto
Regional services (Treno regionale) Naples - Salerno - Potenza - Metaponto - Taranto
Regional services (Treno regionale) Sibari - Monte Giordano - Metaponto

References

This article is based upon a translation of the Italian language version as at June 2014.

Railway stations in Basilicata
Railway stations opened in 1869
Buildings and structures in the Province of Matera
1869 establishments in Italy
Railway stations in Italy opened in the 19th century